Rana Mohammad Hanif Khan (رانا محمد حنیف خان ) was a politician who served as the Finance minister of pakistan from 22 October 1974 to 28 March 1977. He was from the city of [chichawatni, Sahiwal which is in the Punjab, Pakistan. He was the elder son of Ch. Nawab khan who migrated from garhshankar, hoshiyarpur India.

He was barrister at law from Lincoln's Inn, and was an honorable member of the society of Lincoln's Inn. After that he came to Pakistan and started his political career in 1970 with the Pakistan People's Party. He was twice elected as a Member of the National Assembly and was assigned a number of different ministerial portfolios over a span of seven years.

1920s births
2005 deaths
Finance Ministers of Pakistan
Pakistan People's Party politicians
Politicians from Sahiwal
People from Hoshiarpur
Pakistani financiers